is a Japanese arranger and composer, and a founding member of Elements Garden. His work includes composition and arrangement of some tracks of singles and albums of Nana Mizuki including albums Hybrid Universe, Ultimate Diamond and Impact Exciter and singles "Wild Eyes", "Super Generation", "Junketsu Paradox", "Mugen" and Starcamp EP. He also composed music for a track on Mamoru Miyano album Wonder and Mamoru Miyano single Refrain. Along with other members of Elements Garden, he also worked on the soundtrack of the game Wild Arms XF, and composed and arranged music for the game G Senjō no Maō and franchise BanG Dream!. He also arranged music from the PC version of the visual novel Akaneiro ni Somaru Saka. He married singer Suara in 2009.

Filmography

Anime

Video games

References

External links
 Junpei Fujita profile at Elements Garden / Aria Music 
  
 
 Junpei Fujita profile at Oricon 
 Junpei Fujita at Video Game Music Database

Year of birth missing (living people)
Anime composers
Japanese composers
Japanese film score composers
Japanese male composers
Japanese male film score composers
Japanese music arrangers
Living people
Video game composers